Kichwa (also Spanish ) is a Quechuan language that includes all Quechua varieties of Ecuador and Colombia (Inga), as well as extensions into Peru. It has an estimated half million speakers. 

The most widely spoken dialects are Chimborazo, Imbabura and Cañar Highland Quechua, with most of the speakers. Kichwa belongs to the Northern Quechua group of Quechua II, according to linguist Alfredo Torero.

Overview
Kichwa syntax has undergone some grammatical simplification compared to Southern Quechua, perhaps because of partial creolization with the pre-Inca languages of Ecuador.

A standardized language, with a unified orthography, has been developed. It is similar to Chimborazo but lacks some of the phonological peculiarities of that dialect.

The earliest grammatical description of Kichwa was written in the 17th century by Jesuit priest Hernando de Alcocer.

First efforts for language standardization and bilingual education

According to linguist Arturo Muyulema, the first steps to teach Kichwa in public schools dates to the 1940s, when Dolores Cacuango founded several indigenous schools in Cayambe. Later, indigenous organizations initiated self-governed schools to provide education in Kichwa in the 1970s and 1980s (Muyulema 2011:234). 

Muyulema says that the creation of literary works such as Caimi Ñucanchic Shimuyu-Panca, Ñucanchic Llactapac Shimi, Ñucanchic Causaimanta Yachaicuna, and Antisuyu-Punasuyu provided the catalysts for the standardization of Kichwa. This was initiated by DINEIB (National Board of Intercultural Bilingual Education).

Afterward a new alphabet was created by ALKI (Kichwan Language Academy). It comprises 21 characters; including three vowels (a, i, u); two semi-vowels (w, y); and 16 consonants (ch, h, k, l, ll, m, n, ñ, p, r, s, sh, t, ts, z, zh), according to Muyulema's article "Presente y Futuro de la lengua Quichua desde la perspectiva de la experiencia vasca (Kichwa sisariy ñan)" (Muyulema 2011:234).

Later, the bigger and much more comprehensive dictionary Kichwa Yachakukkunapa Shimiyuk Kamu was published in 2009 by the linguist Fabián Potosí, together with other scholars sponsored by the Ministry of Education of Ecuador.

Characteristics

Kiru can mean both "tooth" (kiru in Southern Quechua) and "wood" (qiru  in Southern Quechua), and killa can mean both "moon" (killa) and "lazy" (qilla ).

Additionally, Kichwa in both Ecuador and Colombia has lost possessive and bidirectional suffixes (verbal suffixes indicating both subject and object), as well as the distinction between the exclusive and inclusive first person plural:

Instead of yayayku / taytayku ("Our Father", the Lord's Prayer) Kichwa people say ñukanchik yaya / ñukanchik tayta.
In Kichwa, you do not say suyayki ("I wait for you"), but kanta shuyani.

On the other hand, other particularities of Quechua have been preserved. As in all Quechuan languages, the words for 'brother' and 'sister' differ depending on to whom they refer. There are four different words for siblings: ñaña (sister of a woman), turi (brother of a woman), pani (sister of a man), and wawki (brother of a man). A woman reading "Ñuka wawki Pedromi kan" would read aloud Ñuka turi Pedromi kan (if she referred to her brother). If Pedro has a brother Manuel and the sisters Sisa and Elena, their mother could refer to Pedro as Manuelpak wawki or Sisapaj turi. And to Sisa as Manuelpak pani or as Elenapak ñaña.

Phonology

Consonants

 is often heard as  before a front vowel .
 Sounds , are heard in free variation as fricatives .

  is heard as  before a velar consonant.
  can be heard as fricatives  before a voiceless obstruent, and  before a voiced obstruent.

Vowels

 In the Chimborazo dialect,  is heard as a central , and can also be heard as a back  in lax form.

Dialects

The missionary organization FEDEPI (2006) lists eight dialects of Quechua in Ecuador, which it illustrates with "The men will come in two days." (Ethnologue 16 (2009) lists nine, distinguishing Cañar from Loja Highland Quechua.) Below are the comparisons, along with Standard (Ecuadorian) Kichwa and Standard (Southern) Quechua:

Music
A band from Ecuador, "Los Nin", which raps in Kichwa and Spanish, has toured internationally. The band hails from the town of Otavalo, which is known for its traditional music.

The Ecuadorian band "Yarina", which sings in Kichwa and Spanish, won Best World Music Recording with their album "Nawi" in the 2005 Native American Music Awards.

In the Ecuadorian diaspora, the radio station Kichwa Hatari works to revive use of the Kichwa language, music, and culture in the United States.

References

Bibliography 
 Ciucci, Luca & Pieter C. Muysken 2011. Hernando de Alcocer y la Breve declaración del Arte de la lengua del Ynga. El más antiguo manuscrito de quichua de Ecuador. Indiana 28: 359–393.
 Conejo Muyulema, Arturo. “Presente y futuro de la lengua quichua desde la perspectiva de la experiencia vasca (Kichwa sisariy ñan)” Voces E Imagenes De Las Lenguas En Peligro. Ed. Marleen Haboud and Nicholas Ostler. 1st ed. Abya-Yala, 2014. 234-5.

Further reading

External links 

 https://quechuarealwords.byu.edu/ Quechua Real Words is a video dictionary of Amazonian Kichwa ideophones (performative, imitative utterances)constructed by Professor Janis Nuckolls of BYU.
 Imbabura Quechua Vocabulary List (from the World Loanword Database)
 Map of the regional varieties of Kichwa in Ecuador (quichua.net / FEDEPI.org)
 Kichwa-English-Spanish Dictionary, 2nd Edition (PDF)
 Yachakukkunapa Shimiyuk Kamu, Runa Shimi – Mishu Shimi, Mishu Shimi – Runa Shimi. Kichwa – Spanish, Spanish – Kichwa Dictionary (Education Ministry of Ecuador) (PDF, 7,4 MB)
 Otavalos Online: Basic Kichwa Course for Beginners, in Spanish (PDF)
 Kansas University: Quichua Open Educational Resources (by Nina Kinti-Moss)
 Pieter Muysken: Semantic transparency in Lowland Ecuadorian Quechua morphosyntax (PDF file)
 Openoffice v3.2+ Kichwa Spellchecker 
 Free Quichua audiocourse in Spanish offered by public radio of Ecuador (36 of 110 audio lesson files available via website)
 Kichwa internet radio, New York Times, 16 August 2014
 ELAR archive of Lower Napo Kichwa language documentation materials

Indigenous languages of the Andes
Indigenous languages of Western Amazonia
Languages of Ecuador
Languages of Colombia
Languages of Peru
Quechuan languages